Glenthorne National Park–Ityamaiitpinna Yarta is a national park in the southern Adelaide suburb of O'Halloran Hill,  south of the city centre.

The park opened to the public in November 2020, and  O'Halloran Hill Recreation Park is in the process of transitioning to become part of it. It includes the nearby Glenthorne Estate, and will connect with other parks and parcels of land in Adelaide's south to form the Glenthorne Precinct. These include Hallett Cove Conservation Park, Marino Conservation Park, areas of the Field River Valley and the Happy Valley Reservoir.

The Kaurna people are the traditional owners of the greater Adelaide region, including this area, and still maintain a deep relationship with Country, which they have done for tens of thousands of years through their customs and Tjukurpa. Tjukurpa, which includes cultural stories and lore, will profoundly influence the way the Glenthorne National Park-Ityamaiitpinna Yarta is managed.

The park includes important greybox (a type of eucalypt grassy woodland, and more than 90 species of birds have been spotted within its boundaries, including:
 Adelaide rosella - Platycercusadelaidae
 Grey fantail - Rhipidura albiscapa
 Kookaburra - Dacelo novaeguineae
 Willie wagtail - Rhipidura leucophrys
 Yellow-tailed black cockatoo - Calyptorhynchus funereus
 Yellow-faced honeyeater - Lichenostomus chrysops

References

External links

National parks of South Australia
2020 establishments in Australia
Protected areas established in 2020